Soundman Vol.1 is a debut EP by Nigerian record label Starboy Entertainment. It was released on 6 December 2019 without any announcement. The 7-track EP primarily features vocals by Wizkid, along with assistance from Chronixx, Blaq Jerzee, Kel P, London and DJ Tunez.

Composition
Soundman Vol. 1 is an Afrobeats, reggae and R&B project that was recorded under exclusive license to Starboy Entertainment. Its production was handled by Blaq Jerzee, Kel P, P2J and London. The EP serves as a precursor to Wizkid's fourth studio album Made in Lagos.

Critical reception

Soundman Vol. 1 received mixed reviews from critics. Synord of Naijaloaded awarded the EP 8 stars out of 10, stating the project as "an album for listeners to enjoy with the family and loved ones". Reviewing for SoundStroke, an editor awarded 'SoundMan Vol. 1' 7.4 stars out of 10, commending WizKid; stating "the vocal delivery of the EP is top notch".

Track listing

Notes
"Blow" is the only track that has a music video.

References

2019 debut EPs
Wizkid albums